Kenneth Tolon II (born December 16, 1981 in Albuquerque, New Mexico) is a former running back for the Stanford Cardinal. He played for Stanford from 2000 to 2004.

Early life

Valley High School

While playing for Valley High School of Albuquerque, Tolon received first team all state honors. He was also an academic all-state honoree.

References

External links
 Official Stanford Bio
 Sports Illustrated player page
 Game-by-Game at NCAA
 Scout.com Profile

1981 births
Living people
American football running backs
Players of American football from Albuquerque, New Mexico
Stanford Cardinal football players